This is a list of notable writers from Central America.

Belize

Costa Rica

El Salvador

Guatemala

Honduras

Nicaragua

Panama
Gustavo A. Mellander Navarro

+Central American